William, Will, Bill, or Billy Lee may refer to:

Entertainment
 Bill Lee (singer) (1916–1980), American singer who voiced many Disney characters
 Bill Lee (musician) (born 1928), American jazz musician
 Bill Lee (author) (born 1954), Chinese-American writer and ex-gang member
 Billy Lee (actor) (1929–1989), American child actor
 Bill Lee (Stargate), fictional character on the television series Stargate SG-1
 Will Lee (bassist) (born 1952), American bassist on David Letterman show
 Will Lee (1908–1982), American actor and comedian
 Will Yun Lee (born 1971), American actor
 William Franklin Lee III (1929–2011), pianist, Dean of Miami School of Music
 William Gregory Lee (born 1973), American actor
 William Lee, pen name used by William S. Burroughs

Law
 William Lee (American judge), American judge and member of the Alabama State Legislature
 William Lee (English judge) (1688–1754), British judge and MP for Wycombe
 William Little Lee (1821–1857), first Chief Justice of the Supreme Court for the Kingdom of Hawaii
 William Charles Lee (born 1938), U.S. federal judge
 William F. Lee (born 1950), co-managing partner of law firm WilmerHale
 Bill Lann Lee (born 1949), Chinese-American civil rights lawyer

Military
 William Raymond Lee (1807–1891), American Union Civil War soldier
 William Henry Fitzhugh Lee (1837–1891), Confederate Army general and US congressman
 William C. Lee (1895–1948), American Army soldier and general
 William A. Lee (1900–1998), American Marine and Navy Cross recipient

Politics
 William Lee (diplomat) (1739–1795), American diplomat
 William Lee (Australian politician) (1794–1870), New South Wales politician
 William Henry Lee (1799–1878), Canadian clerk of the Privy Council
 William Lee (1801–1881), British Member of Parliament for Maidstone, 1853–1857 and 1859–1870
 William Scott Lee (1851–1916), mayor of Denver, Colorado, 1887–1889
 William E. Lee (1852–1920), Minnesota politician
 William H. Lee (New York politician) (1876–1954), New York state senator
 Bill Lee (Georgia politician) (1925–2014), American politician from the state of Georgia
 William Swain Lee (born 1935), American lawyer and politician
 Bill Lee (Canadian politician), Progressive Conservative Party of Canada
 Bill Lee (Tennessee politician) (born 1959), Governor of Tennessee

Religion
 William Lee (bishop of Clifton) (1875–1948), Roman Catholic bishop
 William Lee (bishop of Waterford and Lismore) (born 1941), Roman Catholic bishop
 William Lee (priest) (1815–1883), Irish Anglican priest and Archdeacon of Dublin

Sports
 Bill Lee (American football) (1911–1998), American football player
 Bill Lee (left-handed pitcher) (born 1946), American baseball pitcher [aka Spaceman]
 Bill Lee (right-handed pitcher) (1909–1977), American baseball pitcher
 Bill Lee (yacht designer) (born 1942), designer of Merlin 70' Santa Cruz ULDB
 Billy Lee (baseball) (1894–1984), American baseball outfielder 
 Billy Lee (footballer) (1878–1934), English footballer
 William "Caveman" Lee (born 1956), American middleweight boxer
 William Lee (wrestler) (born 1951), American Olympic wrestler

Other
 William Lee (inventor) (c. 1563–1614), inventor of the stocking frame knitting machine
 William Lee (captain) (born 1741), English colonial writer and ship's captain
 William Lee (valet) (1750–1828), George Washington's personal servant
 William Lee (civil engineer) (1812–1891), English biographer and bibliographer of Daniel Defoe
 William Douglas Lee (1894–1965), American architect
 William Ellsworth Lee (1867–1936), American oil businessman
 William Harold Lee (1884–1971), American architect and movie theater designer
 William Poy Lee (born 1951), author and political activist
 William States Lee III (1929–1996), chairman of the board of Duke Power
 Bill Lee (Amtrak station), Chipley, Florida
 William Lee (ship), in the Stone Fleet of the American Civil War
 William Lee (1831 ship), whaler

See also

 William Lea (disambiguation)
 William Leigh (disambiguation)
 Billie (disambiguation)
 Billy (disambiguation)
 Willy (disambiguation)